Rarities is the name of two separate and unrelated compilation albums by the English rock band the Beatles. The first was released in the United Kingdom in December 1978, while the second album was issued in the United States in March 1980.

1978 UK album

Rarities is a British compilation album featuring a selection of songs by the Beatles. The album was originally released as part of The Beatles Collection, a box set featuring all other Beatles records, but was later issued individually. The album has not been released on CD, but all of the tracks are available on the double CD compilation Past Masters.

Rarities was conceived to include lesser-known songs that were not included on any other original Beatles album. These included B-sides of singles, two German-language recordings, the tracks from an EP with exclusive material, a song recorded for the American market and a version of "Across the Universe" that had previously appeared on a World Wildlife Fund charity record.

The choice of selections seems to assume that the customer already has all the regular-issue British albums (that is, the albums included in the 1978 box set), along with the career-spanning compilations 1962–1966 and 1967–1970, and the Magical Mystery Tour LP (which was originally only released in the US), but not A Collection of Beatles Oldies or Hey Jude. Such a collector would own copies of every song in the entire Beatles catalogue except for all the songs provided on Rarities. Such a collector would still be missing the original single version of "Love Me Do", however. This track, which went out of print in late 1963, was not available anywhere until its inclusion on the 1980 American Rarities. It was finally made available again in Britain in 1982 on the "Love Me Do" 12-single.

The album was released on 2 November 1978 in the UK, as part of the British edition of The Beatles Collection box set. On 12 October 1979, Rarities was issued as a stand-alone album in the United Kingdom.

Track listing
All songs written by Lennon–McCartney except where indicated. All songs are in mono unless indicated as stereo.

Side one
"Across the Universe" ("Wildlife" version from a British various artists charity album titled No One's Gonna Change Our World) stereo
"Yes It Is" (B-side)
"This Boy" (B-side)
"The Inner Light" (George Harrison) (B-side)
"I'll Get You" (B-side)
"Thank You Girl" (B-side)
"Komm Gib Mir Deine Hand" (German version of "I Want to Hold Your Hand") stereo
"You Know My Name (Look Up The Number)" (B-side)
"Sie liebt dich" (German version of "She Loves You") stereo
 
The US pressing of Rarities included in the limited-edition numbered box set of The Beatles Collection contained "I Want to Hold Your Hand" rather than "Komm Gib Mir Deine Hand", and "She Loves You" rather than "Sie Liebt Dich".
 
Side two
"Rain" (B-side)
"She's a Woman" (B-side)
"Matchbox" (Perkins) (From Long Tall Sally EP)
"I Call Your Name" (From Long Tall Sally EP)
"Bad Boy" (Williams) (recorded for the American LP Beatles VI, first UK release on A Collection of Beatles Oldies) stereo
"Slow Down" (Williams) (From Long Tall Sally EP)
"I'm Down" (B-side)
"Long Tall Sally" (Johnson/Penniman/Blackwell) (From "Long Tall Sally" EP)

Charts and certifications

Charts

Certifications

1980 US album

Rarities is a compilation album released by Capitol Records in North America, featuring a selection of songs by the Beatles. The album was inspired by an earlier compilation of the same name which was released as part of The Beatles Collection box set. Most of the tracks on the Beatles Collection disc titled Rarities were already available on American Beatles LPs. As a result, Capitol assembled an album of Beatles tracks that were considered rare in America. They include tracks not previously issued on a Capitol or Apple LP and alternative versions of several well-known songs which were also not readily available in America. A highlight of the album was the gatefold sleeve featuring the controversial "butcher" photo from the 1966 Yesterday and Today album.

Although the Capitol Rarities album was geared towards the American market, it was also issued in several other countries, including Australia, Canada, France, Japan and New Zealand. The Rarities album has not been released on compact disc. All but three of the tracks were subsequently made available on other Beatles CDs, such as the Beatles' 2009 mono and stereo box sets.

After the album was released in 1980, Paul McCartney stated that it was "quite good".

Track listing
All songs written by Lennon–McCartney except where noted.

Side one
"Love Me Do"
Mono, original UK single on Parlophone 45-R4949 with Ringo Starr on drums; now available on Past Masters
"Misery"
Stereo, previously issued on Vee-Jay LP Introducing... The Beatles; available on Please Please Me
"There's a Place"
Stereo, previously issued on Vee Jay LP Introducing... The Beatles; available on Please Please Me
"Sie Liebt Dich"
Stereo, previously released only as a mono single in the US on Swan Records; now available on Past Masters
"And I Love Her"
Stereo, alternate version with six-bar ending; originally issued in Germany; available on The Beatles Box, not available on CD
"Help!"
Mono, with different vocals than the stereo LP; available on The Beatles in Mono
"I'm Only Sleeping"
Stereo, final UK Revolver mix (early mono and alternate stereo mixes were released in the US)
"I Am the Walrus"
Stereo, new edit compiled from US single and UK album releases: six note intro and extra beats before the "Yellow matter custard" verse; available on The Beatles Box, not available on CD

Side two
"Penny Lane"
Stereo, new version compiled from the German true stereo version with the US promotional mono version's extra piccolo trumpet solo added onto the ending; not available on CD. available on The Beatles Box
"Helter Skelter"
Mono, ends at first fadeout without Ringo Starr's "blisters" outburst (first pressings erroneously attribute the statement to John Lennon in the album's liner notes);  available on The Beatles in Mono
"Don't Pass Me By" (Starkey)
Mono, sped-up version with different violin in places; available on The Beatles in Mono
"The Inner Light" (Harrison)
Mono, previously released as the B-side of "Lady Madonna"; now available on Mono Masters
"Across the Universe"
Stereo, original version from No One's Gonna Change Our World, a British compilation album made for the World Wildlife Fund; now available on Past Masters
"You Know My Name (Look Up the Number)"
Mono, previously released as the B-side of "Let It Be"; now available on Past Masters
"Sgt. Pepper Inner Groove"
Stereo, a piece that ended the original British release of Sgt. Pepper's Lonely Hearts Club Band but was not included on the American version of the album. It consists of a few seconds of 15 kilohertz tone (similar to a dog whistle) followed by two seconds of laughter and noise on the runout groove. The tone is not included on this album but the laughter and noise are featured just before the actual runout groove. It has since been restored, including the high-pitch tone, for all worldwide CD and cassette versions of Sgt. Pepper as well as the 2012 vinyl remaster of the LP.  The track is only the snippet on the Rarities album, not repeated (mimicking an album "stuck" on the inner groove) as on the Sgt. Pepper album.

Charts and certifications

Charts

Certifications

References

Albums produced by George Martin
B-side compilation albums
1978 compilation albums
The Beatles compilation albums
1980 compilation albums
Capitol Records compilation albums
Parlophone compilation albums
Albums arranged by George Martin